David "Dai" Morgan Jenkins (22 May 1901 – 22 April 1968) was a Welsh dual-code international rugby union, and professional rugby league footballer who played in the 1920s and 1930s. As an amateur union player he represented Kenfig Hill, Treorchy and Glamorgan Police RFC, while as a professional rugby league footballer he played for Hunslet, Leeds and Dewsbury.

Playing career
Jenkins first played rugby as a school boy, representing Bryndu School in Kenfig Hill. A keen sportsman as a youth, he also enjoyed association football, and had trials with Swansea AFC. After leaving school he joined local club Kenfig Hill, but by the time he was selected to represent Wales in 1926, he had switched to Rhondda team, Treorchy. His first international appearance was in the opening Wales game of the 1926 Five Nations Championship; played against England at the Cardiff Arms Park. The game ended in a 3–3 draw, but Jenkins had done enough to secure his place with the Welsh selectors, and was chosen for the three remaining games of the Championship: a loss away to Scotland, followed by wins over Ireland and France. It is unknown if Jenkins would have been selected for any further rugby union internationals as in August 1926 he switched codes, becoming a professional rugby league footballer with Hunslet.

Dai Jenkins won three caps for Wales while at Hunslet, his first on 26 April 1927 in an encounter with England at Broughton. This was followed by another two caps in 1928 and 1931, both games against England. The 1928 match, played at Cardiff, saw Jenkins score a try, the only international points of his career. In 1931 he switched from Hunslet to Leeds, and in 1932 won his final cap for Wales, in his fourth encounter with England, and all resulting in losses for Wales. In 1934 he moved clubs again, switching from Leeds to Dewsbury.

David Morgan Jenkins played left-, i.e. number 8, in Glamorgan's 18-14 victory over Monmouthshire in the non-County Championship match during the 1926–27 season at Taff Vale Park, Pontypridd on Saturday 30 April 1927.

David Morgan Jenkins played left-, i.e. number 8, and scored a try in the Hunslet FC's 7-13 defeat by Hull Kingston Rovers in the 1929–30 Yorkshire County Cup Final during the 1929–30 season at Headingley Rugby Stadium, Leeds on Saturday 30 November 1929, in front of a crowd of 11,000.

References

1901 births
1968 deaths
Glamorgan Police officers
Dewsbury Rams players
Dual-code rugby internationals
Glamorgan Police RFC players
Glamorgan rugby league team players
Hunslet F.C. (1883) players
Kenfig Hill RFC players
Leeds Rhinos players
Rugby league players from Bridgend County Borough
Rugby league props
Rugby union locks
Rugby union players from Bridgend County Borough
Treorchy RFC players
Wales international rugby union players
Wales national rugby league team players
Welsh police officers
Welsh rugby league players
Welsh rugby union players